The Myanzi–Kassanda–Bukuya–Kiboga Road is a road in Uganda, connecting the towns of Myanzi, Kassanda and Bukuya in Mubende District, to Kiboga in Kiboga District.

Location
The coordinates of the road near Kassanda are 0°36'53.0"N, 31°50'09.0"E (Latitude:0.614735; Longitude:31.835822).

Overview
This road is an important transport corridor between Kiboga District and Mubende District. The road is prone to flooding, and when it does, it disrupts travel between the two districts and between those two and Mityana District.

Upgrading to bitumen
The gravel-surfaced road is under the purview of Uganda National Roads Authority. During his 2016 presidential electoral campaigns, President Yoweri Museveni made a pledge to upgrade this road to class II bitumen standard.

See also
 Uganda National Roads Authority

References

External links
 Webpage of Uganda National Road Authority

Roads in Uganda
Kiboga District
Mubende District
Central Region, Uganda